John Joseph O'Connor (January 15, 1920 – May 3, 2000) was an American prelate of the Catholic Church. He served as Archbishop of New York from 1984 until his death in 2000, and was made a cardinal in 1985. He previously served as a U.S. Navy chaplain (1952–1979, including four years as Chief), auxiliary bishop of the Military Vicariate of the United States (1979–1983), and Bishop of Scranton in Pennsylvania (1983–1984).

Biography

Early life 
O'Connor was born in Philadelphia, the fourth of five children of Thomas J. O'Connor, and Dorothy Magdalene (née Gomple) O'Connor (1886–1971), daughter of Gustave Gumpel, a kosher butcher and Jewish rabbi. In 2014, his sister Mary O'Connor Ward discovered through genealogical research that their mother was born Jewish and was baptized as a Roman Catholic at age 19. John's parents were wed the following year.

O'Connor attended public schools until his junior year of high school, when he enrolled in West Philadelphia Catholic High School for Boys. He then enrolled at St. Charles Borromeo Seminary in Wynnewood, Pennsylvania.

Priesthood 
Upon graduating from St. Charles, O'Connor was ordained a priest for the Archdiocese of Philadelphia on December 15, 1945, by Auxiliary Bishop Hugh L. Lamb. After his ordination, O'Connor was a faculty member at St. James High School in Chester, Pennsylvania.

O'Connor joined the United States Navy Chaplain Corps in 1952 during the Korean War.He was eventually named rear admiral and chief of chaplains of the Navy in 1975.He obtained approval for the establishment of the RP [Religious Program Specialist] Enlisted Rating, and oversaw the process of standing up this rating, initially accepting transfers from other enlisted rates. The RP rating provided chaplains with a dedicated enlisted community, instead of yeomen transferred to assist a chaplain for a period before returning to their nominal yeoman rate. During this period, he was made an honorary prelate of his holiness, with the title of right reverend monsignor, on October 27, 1966.

O'Connor obtained a master's degree in advanced ethics from Villanova University in Philadelphia. He also received a doctorate in political science from Georgetown University, where he studied under the United States' future Ambassador to the United Nations Jeane Kirkpatrick. Kirkpatrick said of O'Connor that he was "... surely one of the two or three smartest graduate students I've ever had."

Auxiliary Bishop of the Military Vicariate US 
On April 24, 1979, Pope John Paul II appointed O'Connor as an auxiliary bishop of the Military Vicariate for the United States and titular bishop of Cursola. He was consecrated to the episcopate on May 27, 1979, at St. Peter's Basilica in Rome by John Paul himself, with Cardinals Duraisamy Lourdusamy and Eduardo Somalo as co-consecrators.

Bishop of Scranton 
On May 6, 1983, John Paul II named O'Connor as bishop of the Diocese of Scranton, and he was installed in that position on June 29, 1983.

Archbishop of New York 

On January 26, 1984, after the death of Cardinal Terence Cooke, O'Connor was appointed archbishop of the Archdiocese of New York and administrator of the Military Vicariate of the United States; he was installed on March 19.

O'Connor was elevated to cardinal in the consistory of May 25, 1985, with the titular church of Santi Giovanni e Paolo in Rome (the traditional one for the Archbishop of New York from 1946 to 2009).

Illness and death 
When O'Connor reached the retirement age for bishops of 75 years in January 1995, he submitted his resignation to Pope John Paul II as required by canon law, but the Pope did not accept it. He was diagnosed in 1999 as having a brain tumor. He continued to serve as Archbishop of New York until his death.

O'Connor died in the archbishop's residence on May 3, 2000, and was interred in the crypt beneath the main altar of St. Patrick's Cathedral. It was presided over by Cardinal Secretary of State Angelo Sodano. At O'Connor's request, the homily was delivered by Cardinal Bernard F. Law and the eulogy was delivered by Cardinal William W. Baum.

Attendees include Secretary-General of the United Nations Kofi Annan, US President Bill Clinton and First Lady Hillary Clinton, Vice President Al Gore, Secretary of State Madeleine Albright, former President George H. W. Bush, Texas Governor George W. Bush, New York Governor George Pataki, New York City Mayor Rudolph Giuliani, former New York City Mayors Ed Koch, and David Dinkins.

Legacy

O'Connor was posthumously awarded the Jackie Robinson Empire State Medal of Freedom by New York Governor George Pataki on December 21, 2000. On March 7, 2000, O'Connor was awarded the Congressional Gold Medal by unanimous support in the United States Senate and only one vote against - Representative Ron Paul - the resolution in the United States House of Representatives.

The John Cardinal O'Connor Pavilion in Riverdale, Bronx, a residence for retired priests, opened in 2003. The John Cardinal O'Connor School in Irvington, New York, for students with learning differences, opened in 2009. The largest student-run pro-life conference in the United States is also named in his honor. It is held annually at Georgetown University.

Upon his death, The New York Times called O'Connor "a familiar and towering presence, a leader whose views and personality were forcefully injected into the great civic debates of his time, a man who considered himself a conciliator, but who never hesitated to be a combatant", and one of the Catholic Church's "most powerful symbols on moral and political issues."

According to New York City Mayor Ed Koch: "Cardinal O'Connor was a great man, but he was like the Pentagon. He was incapable of saving money."

Following his death, SEIU 1199 published a 12-page tribute to O'Connor, calling him "the patron saint of working people". It described his support for low-wage and other workers, his efforts in helping the limousine drivers unionize, his helping end a strike at The Daily News, and his pushing for fringe benefits for minimum-wage home health care workers.

Viewpoints

Human life 
O'Connor was a forceful opponent of abortion, human cloning, capital punishment, human trafficking, and unjust war. He assailed what he called the "horror of euthanasia", asking rhetorically, "What makes us think that permitted lawful suicide will not become obligated suicide?" In 2000, O'Connor called for a "major overhaul" of the punitive Rockefeller drug laws in New York State, which he believed produced "grave injustices".

US foreign policy
O'Connor offered severe critiques of some United States military policies. In the 1980s, he condemned US support for counterrevolutionary guerrilla forces in Central America, opposed the U.S. mining of the waters off Nicaragua, questioned spending on new weapons systems, and preached caution in regard to American military actions abroad.

In 1998, O'Connor questioned whether the United States' cruise missile strikes on Afghanistan and Sudan were morally justifiable. In 1999, during the Kosovo War, he used his weekly column in the archdiocesan newspaper, Catholic New York, to challenge repeatedly the morality of NATO's bombing campaign of Yugoslavia, suggesting that it did not meet the Catholic Church's criteria for a Just War, and going so far as to ask, "Does the relentless bombing of Yugoslavia prove the power of the Western world or its weakness?" Three years before the 9/11 attacks on New York City, which occurred after his death, O'Connor insisted that the traditional Just War principles must be applied to evaluate the morality of military responses to unconventional warfare and terrorism.

Organized labor
O'Connor's father had been a lifelong union member and O'Connor was a passionate defender of organized labor, as well as an advocate for the poor and the homeless.

During a strike in 1984 by SEIU 1199, the largest health care workers union in New York City, O'Connor strongly criticized the League of Voluntary Hospitals, of which the archdiocese was a member, for threatening to fire striking union members who refused to return to work, calling it "strikebreaking" and vowing that no Catholic hospital would do so. The following year, when a contract with SEIU 1199 still had not been reached, he threatened to break with the League and settle with the union unilaterally to reach an agreement "that gives justice to the workers".

In his homily during a Labor Day mass at St. Patrick's in 1986, O'Connor expressed his strong commitment to organized labor: "[S]o many of our freedoms in this country, so much of the building up of society, is precisely attributable to the union movement, a movement that I personally will defend despite the weakness of some of its members, despite the corruption with which we are all familiar that pervades all society, a movement that I personally will defend with my life."In 1987, when the television broadcast employees' union was on strike against the National Broadcasting Corporation (NBC), a non-union crew from NBC appeared at the cardinal's residence to cover one of O'Connor's press conferences. O'Connor declined to admit them, directing his secretary to "tell them they're not invited."

Relations with Jewish community
O'Connor played an active role in Catholic–Jewish relations. He strongly denounced anti-Semitism, declaring that one "cannot be a faithful Christian and an anti-Semite. They are incompatible, because anti-Semitism is a sin." He wrote an apology to Jewish leaders in New York City for past harm done to the Jewish community.

O'Connor criticized the failure of Swiss banks' to compensate Jewish Holocaust victims whose assets were deposited in Switzerland by German Nazi leaders. He called it "a human rights issue, an issue of the human race." Even when disagreeing with him over political questions, Jewish leaders acknowledged that O'Connor was "a friend, a powerful voice against anti-Semitism".

The Jewish Council for Public Affairs called O'Connor , "a true friend and champion of Catholic–Jewish relations, [and] a humanitarian who used the power of his pulpit to advocate for disadvantaged people throughout the world and in his own community." Nobel Laureate Elie Wiesel called O'Connor, "a good Christian" and a man "who understands our pain."

Relations with the LGBT community

St. Patrick's protest and work with HIV/AIDS patients 
On December 10, 1989, 4,500 members of ACT UP and Women's Health Action and Mobilization (WHAM) held a demonstration at St. Patrick's Cathedral to voice their opposition to O'Connor's positions on HIV/AIDS education, the distribution of condoms in public schools, and abortion rights for women. The protest resulted in 43 arrests inside the cathedral. O'Connor believed that Catholic teaching taught that homosexual acts are never permissible, while homosexual desires are disordered but not in themselves sinful.

O'Connor made an effort to minister to 1,000 people dying of HIV/AIDS and their families, following up on other HIV/AIDS patients. He visited Saint Vincent's Catholic Medical Center, where he cleaned the sores and emptied the bedpans of more than 1,100 patients. According to reports, O'Connor was popular with the Saint Vincent's patients, many of whom did not know he was the archbishop, and was supportive of other priests who ministered to gay men and others with HIV/AIDS. O'Connor personally led the 1990 funeral Mass for James Zappalorti, a gay man who was murdered on Staten Island, New York. O'Connor endorsed a statewide hate crime law that included crimes motivated by sexual orientation, which passed shortly after his own death in 2000.

Executive Order 50 
O'Connor actively opposed Executive Order 50, a mayoral order issued in 1980 by New York Mayor Ed Koch. Order 50 required all city contractors, including religious entities, to provide services on a non-discriminatory basis with respect to race, creed, age, sex, handicap, as well as "sexual orientation or  preference". After the Salvation Army received a warning from the city that its contracts for child care services would be canceled for refusing to comply with the executive order's provisions regarding sexual orientation, the Archdiocese of New York and Agudath Israel, an Orthodox Jewish organization, threatened to cancel their contracts with the city if forced to comply. O'Connor maintained that the executive order would cause the Catholic Church to appear to condone homosexual activity. Writing in Catholic New York in January 1985, O'Connor characterized the order as "an exceedingly dangerous precedent [that would] invite unacceptable governmental intrusion into and excessive entanglement with the Church's conducting of its own internal affairs." Drawing the traditional Catholic distinction between homosexual "inclinations" and "behavior", he stated that "we do not believe that homosexual behavior ... should be elevated to a protected category."

We do not believe that religious agencies should be required to employ those engaging in or advocating homosexual behavior. We are willing to consider on a case-by-case basis the employment of individuals who have engaged in or may at some future time engage in homosexual behavior. We approach those who have engaged in or may engage in what the Church considers illicit heterosexual behavior the same way. ...We believe, however, that only a religious agency itself can properly determine the requirements of any particular job within that agency, and whether or not a particular individual meets or is reasonably likely to meet such requirements.

Subsequently, the Salvation Army, the archdiocese, and Agudath Israel, together with the Chamber of Commerce and Industry, sued the City of New York to overturn Executive Order 50 on the grounds that the mayor had exceeded his executive authority in issuing it. In September 1984, the New York Supreme Court agreed with the plaintiffs. It struck down that part of the order that prohibited discrimination based upon "sexual orientation or affectational preference" on the grounds that the mayor had exceeded his authority. In June 1985, New York's highest court upheld the lower court's decision striking down Executive Order 50.

O'Connor vigorously and actively opposed city and state legislation guaranteeing LGBT civil rights, including legislation (supported by then-mayors Ed Koch, David Dinkins, and Rudy Giuliani) prohibiting discrimination based upon sexual orientation in housing, public accommodations and employment.

St. Patrick's Day parade 
O'Connor also supported the decision by the Ancient Order of Hibernians to exclude the Irish Lesbian and Gay Organization from marching under its own banner in New York City's St. Patrick's Day parade. The Hibernians argued that their decision as to which organizations may march in the parade, which honors Saint Patrick, a Catholic saint, was protected by the First Amendment and that they could not be compelled to admit a group whose beliefs conflicted with theirs. In 1992, in a decision criticized by the New York Civil Liberties Union, the City of New York ordered the Hibernians to admit the Irish Lesbian and Gay Organization to march in the parade. The city subsequently denied the Hibernians a permit for the parade until, in 1993, a federal judge in New York held that the city's permit denial was "patently unconstitutional" because the parade was private, not public, and constituted "a pristine form of speech" as to which the parade sponsor had a right to control the content and tone.

In 1987, O'Connor prohibited DignityUSA, an organization of LGBT Catholics, from holding masses in parishes in the archdiocese. After eight years of protests by the group, O'Connor started meeting with the DignityUSA twice a year.

HIV and condom controversy

Contraception and condom distribution 
O'Connor opposed condom distribution as an AIDS-prevention measure, viewing it as being contrary to the Catholic Church's teaching that contraception is immoral and its use a sin. O'Connor rejected the argument that condoms distributed to gay men are not contraceptives. O'Connor's response was that using an "evil act" was not justified by good intentions, and that the church should not be seen as encouraging sinful acts among others (other fertile heterosexual couples who might wrongly interpret his narrow support as license for their own contraception). He also claimed that sexual abstinence is a sure way to prevent infection, claiming condoms were only 50% effective against HIV transmission. HIV activist group ACT UP (AIDS Coalition to Unleash Power)  criticized the cardinal's opinion, leading to confrontations between the group and O'Connor.

Early on in the AIDS epidemic, O'Connor approved the opening of a specialized AIDS unit to provide medical care for the sick and dying in the former St. Clare's Hospital in Manhattan, the first of its kind in the state. He often nurtured and ministered to dying AIDS patients, many of whom were homosexual. Some members of ACT UP protested in front of St. Patrick's Cathedral, holding placards such as "Cardinal O'Connor Loves Gay People ... If They Are Dying of AIDS."

Watkins Commission 
In 1987, US President Ronald Reagan appointed O'Connor to the President's Commission on the HIV Epidemic, also known as the Watkins Commission. O'Connor served with 12 other members, few of whom were AIDS experts, including James D. Watkins, Richard DeVos, and Penny Pullen. The commission was initially controversial among HIV researchers and activists as lacking expertise on the disease and as being in disarray. The Watkins Commission surprised many of its critics, however, by issuing a final report in 1988 that lent conservative support for antibias laws to protect HIV-positive people, on-demand treatment for drug addicts, and the speeding of AIDS-related research. The New York Times praised the commission's "remarkable strides" and its proposed $2 billion campaign against AIDS among drug addicts. The Watkins Commission's recommendations were similar to the recommendations subsequently made by a committee of HIV experts appointed by the National Academy of Sciences.

Theodore McCarrick
O'Connor was involved with the career of Theodore McCarrick, a prominent figure in the American hierarchy. McCarrick was the subject of rumors for many years that he had sexually abused seminarians; McCarrick resigned from the College of Cardinals in 2018 and was laicized in 2019. O'Connor grew more skeptical of McCarrick over the years.

In April 1986, O'Connor strongly endorsed making McCarrick Archbishop of Newark. In 1992 and 1993 he received several anonymous letters accusing McCarrick of sexually abusing seminarians, and he shared them with McCarrick. In 1994, on behalf of the Apostolic Nuncio to the U.S., who was concerned about a potential scandal, he arranged for an investigation into rumors McCarrick, then Archbishop of Newark, had engaged in inappropriate sexual behavior with seminarians and he concluded that there were "no impediments" to including Newark on a planned papal visit to the U.S.

In October 1996, though two psychiatrists found a priest's charge of sexual abuse by McCarrick credible, O'Connor remained skeptical.That same month, however, he intervened to prevent a priest "too closely identified" with McCarrick from becoming an auxiliary bishop citing "a rather unsettled climate of opinion about certain issues" in Newark.

In October 1999, when McCarrick was under consideration for transfer to a more important see than Newark, O'Connor wrote a letter to the Apostolic Nuncio to the U.S. and the Congregation for Bishops—a letter that Pope John Paul II read—that summarized the charges against McCarrick, especially his repeatedly arranging for seminarians and other men to share his bed. O'Connor concluded: "I regret that I would have to recommend very strongly against such promotion." McCarrick learned about this letter from contacts in the Curia and in August 2000, several months after O'Connor's death, wrote a rebuttal that convinced John Paul II to appoint him archbishop of Washington.

References

Cited works

Further reading

External links 
 

1920 births
2000 deaths
Clergy from Philadelphia
American Roman Catholic clergy of Irish descent
Villanova University alumni
St. Charles Borromeo Seminary alumni
Korean War chaplains
United States Navy chaplains
Walsh School of Foreign Service alumni
United States Navy rear admirals (upper half)
Chiefs of Chaplains of the United States Navy
People from Scranton, Pennsylvania
Roman Catholic archbishops of New York
20th-century American cardinals
American people of Jewish descent
American anti-abortion activists
Congressional Gold Medal recipients
Founders of Catholic religious communities
Knights of Malta
Cardinals created by Pope John Paul II
Deaths from cancer in New York (state)
Deaths from brain cancer in the United States
Burials at St. Patrick's Cathedral (Manhattan)
Catholics from Pennsylvania